Moonlight Mile (stylized in all caps) is a Japanese manga series written and illustrated by Yasuo Ohtagaki. It was serialized in Shogakukan's seinen manga magazine Big Comic Superior from December 2000 to November 2011, when the manga entered a ten-year hiatus. It resumed publication on Pixiv in December 2021. A 26-episode anime television series by Studio Hibari was broadcast on Wowow for two seasons in 2007.

The story follows a pair of mountain climbers who decide to become astronauts. Yasuo Ohtagaki says, in the preview special of the anime, that his goal in writing the story was to create a realistic space drama that features the political elements involved in modern space missions. Ken Noguchi, a professional mountain climber, provided inspiration to the creators of Moonlight Mile for their depictions of ascending Mount Everest.

Plot
Gorou Saruwatari and Jack "Lostman" Woodbridge are mountain climbers who have ascended some of the highest mountains around the world. At the peak of Mount Everest, they see the International Space Station in the sky above and become determined to go into space. At the same time, the International Space Association (ISA) begins the "Nexus" program to research and obtain a new energy source (Helium-3) which has been discovered on the moon. Gorou and Lostman attempt to join the program through different approaches: Lostman becomes a military pilot and Gorou takes a job as a construction worker.

Characters
 Jack F. Woodbridge, a.k.a. "Lostman"
 Gorou Saruwatari
 Kousuke Sawamura
 Steve O'Brien
 Miguel
 Riyoko Ikeuchi
 Maggy Hiraoka
 Akemi Saruwatari

Media

Manga
Written and illustrated by Yasuo Ohtagaki, Moonlight Mile started in Shogakukan's seinen manga magazine Big Comic Superior on December 7, 2000. The series' first part finished in October 2007; the second part started in December of the same year. The second part finished in November 2011 and the manga entered on hiatus, when it was announced that Ohtagaki would start a new series, Mobile Suit Gundam Thunderbolt. Shogakukan collected its chapters into individual tankōbon volumes. The first volume was released on May 30, 2001. The 23rd and last volume by Shogakukan was released on January 30, 2012. Shogakukan re-released the first part in a five-volume edition, which collected three original tankōbon volumes in one, from October 30, 2012, to July 30, 2013. In May 2021, Ohtagaki announced that the manga would resume publication; the series resumed with its third part on the Pixiv website on December 25 of the same year. The 24th volume was published as an ebook by Number Nine on December 23, 2022.

Anime
An anime television series adaptation by Studio Hibari was broadcast on Wowow in 2007; the first season, Lift off, was broadcast for twelve episodes from February 4 to May 26; the second season, Touch down, was broadcast for fourteen episodes from September 13 to December 13, 2007. The main opening theme was composed by Kan Sawada, while the Pillows performed the ending themes "Scarecrow" and "BOAT HOUSE" for the first and second season, respectively.

ADV Films acquired the license for U.S. distribution of Moonlight Mile on July 21, 2007. This was announced at Otakon 2007. The series began its US DVD release on March 3, 2008 and the third and final volume came out on 05/20/2008. A box to hold all three volumes was released with the second volume. As it is currently known, only the first season LIFT Off has been licensed for a North American release. In July 2008, the anime became one of over 30 ADV titles transferred to Funimation.

Season 1
{| class="wikitable" style="width:100%;"
|-
! style="width:3%;"| # !! Title !! style="width:8%;"| Original air date
|-
| colspan="3"|
|-

|}

Season 2
{| class="wikitable" style="width:100%;"
|-
! style="width:3%;"| # !! Title !! style="width:8%;"| Original air date
|-
| colspan="3"|
|-

|}

References

Further reading

External links
 

ADV Films
Anime series based on manga
Funimation
Science fiction anime and manga
Seinen manga
Shogakukan manga
Studio Hibari